Vishan (also Romanized as Vīshān) is a village in Dolfak Rural District, Khorgam District, Rudbar County, Gilan Province, Iran. At the 2006 census, its population was 24, in 7 families.

References 

Populated places in Rudbar County